The Vancouver Dodgeball League (referred to as VDL) is a non-profit organization that was founded on February 11, 2005, on the idea that dodgeball could build a positive community. The League's dedicated commission is to promote the sport of dodgeball and build a vibrant community in the Greater Vancouver area. 

VDL is Vancouver’s first, largest and only non-profit dodgeball organization. VDL’s mission is to advance dodgeball in Vancouver and build a community that’s based on fun, fitness, service and spirit. VDL is governed by a board of directors, and all revenues go back to supporting this mission.

VDL has a tier system that caters to recreational and competitive play. There are three tiers per division, according to the competitiveness of the team. At the end of the season, teams are divided into six tiers for playoffs, depending on their cumulative performance.

In addition to league play, each season has an exhibition night, skills clinic, skills competition, pub night, and playoffs. They organize tournaments sponsoring various charitable causes.

History
Founded in 2004 by Kevin Bao, VDL began by hosting various drop-in nights and tournaments. Twelve players attended the first drop-in night, and a few months later, that number swelled up to 120 players playing in tournaments. With a founding team consisting of Keith Bao, Truong Cao, Amy Chin, Jason Chow, and Eddie Lee, VDL began offering league play in Spring 2006 (Season 1), which became a permanent home for avid dodgeball players. VDL has now grown into the largest dodgeball league in Metro Vancouver, played across 4 nights a week including a subsidiary league in Coquitlam (CDL), with over 200 teams and 1,500 players.

Timeline

Awards

Community

Logo 
In October 2005 the original VDL logo was notably designed by well known Vancouver based graphic designer, Graeme Jack. Following it's creation the VDL commissioned Graeme Jack to create the IDA logo (International Dodgeball Association) and the CDL logo (Coquitlam Dodgeball League). In later years the formation of the RDL (Richmond Dodgeball League) took inspiration from the original VDL logo.

External links
Vancouver Dodgeball League Official Page
The Courier
Georgia Straight Article: League draws hundreds to dodge the inevitable

Dodgeball
Non-profit organizations based in Vancouver
Sports organizations of Canada